Peter Doyle OBE (1921–2004) was a British chemist.

Career
Doyle obtained his degree from the University of London in 1944. In 1952 he obtained a position at Beecham Laboratories in Betchworth, and became Director of Research at Beecham Pharmaceuticals in 1962.

Along with Ralph Batchelor, George Rolinson, and John Nayler, he was part of the team at Betchworth that discovered and synthesised new penicillins. A Royal Society of Chemistry blue plaque now marks this discovery. Doyle retired in 1983.

Awards
Doyle was given the Worshipful Society of Apothecaries' Gold Medal in Therapeutics in 1964 (awarded jointly with Dr. G N Rolinson).

In 1971, he was among a group awarded the Royal Society's Mullard Medal.

He was made an Officer of the Order of the British Empire (OBE) in 1977 "for services to the pharmaceutical industry".

References

External links 

 

1921 births
2004 deaths
Place of birth missing
Place of death missing
British chemists
Officers of the Order of the British Empire